A solenoid is a type of electromagnet formed by a coil of wire

Solenoid may also refer to:

 Solenoid (engineering), an actuator which uses an electromagnet to convert electrical energy to mechanical energy
 Starter solenoid, part of an automobile ignition system; also called a starter relay
 Transmission solenoid
 Solenoidal vector field, a vector field in mathematics characterized as having zero divergence
 Solenoid (DNA) in genetics
 Solenoid (mathematics)
 Solenoid (meteorology)
 Solenoid valve
 Solenoid protein domain